Biohazard is the debut studio album by American heavy metal band Biohazard, released in June 1990 by Magnetic Air.

The intro to the song "Retribution" is from the movie The Godfather Part II.

The songs "Wrong Side of the Tracks" and "Hold My Own" were rerecorded for the band's second album Urban Discipline. The 2004 remaster features a different cover than the original 1990 pressing.

Track listing

Personnel
 Evan Seinfeld – vocals, bass
 Billy Graziadei – guitar, vocals
 Bobby Hambel – guitar
 Danny Schuler – drums

References

Biohazard (band) albums
1990 debut albums